Opus clavicembalisticum is a work for solo piano composed by Kaikhosru Shapurji Sorabji, completed on 25 June 1930.

It is notable for its length and difficulty: at the time of its completion it was the longest piano piece in existence. Its duration is around 4–4½ hours, depending on tempo. Several of Sorabji's later works, such as the Symphonic Variations for Piano (which last probably about nine hours) are even longer.

At the time of its completion, it was possibly the most technically demanding solo piano work in existence due, for the most part, to its extreme length and rhythmic complexity and to the vast resources of physical and mental stamina demanded by its many passages of transcendental virtuosity, although some works conceived by New Complexity, modernist and avant-garde composers, along with Sorabji himself, were more difficult still; it is in this particular area that Opus clavicembalisticum primarily receives its notoriety, and to this day is still highly regarded in that light.

Sorabji may in part have been inspired to compose the work after hearing a performance by Egon Petri of Busoni's Fantasia contrappuntistica and Opus clavicembalisticum to some degree embraces an homage to Busoni's work. Sorabji's earlier (1928) Toccata No. 1, also for piano solo and likewise a multi-movement work, evidences similar Busonian influence and is in some ways a precursor of Opus clavicembalisticum.

Structure 
Opus clavicembalisticum has twelve movements, of hugely varying dimensions: from a brief cadenza, lasting only three minutes, to a mammoth interlude, containing a toccata, adagio, and passacaglia (with 81 variations), requiring around an hour to play. The work's movements are set in three parts, each larger than the last:

The manuscript and publication both erroneously say that the sixth movement (Interludium primum) has forty-four variations instead of forty-nine.

Composition and dedication 
In a letter upon completion of the massive work on 25 June 1930, Sorabji wrote to a friend of his:
With a wracking head and literally my whole body shaking as with ague I write this and tell you I have just this afternoon early finished Clavicembalisticum... The closing 4 pages are so cataclysmic and catastrophic as anything I've ever done—the harmony bites like nitric acid—the counterpoint grinds like the mills of God... (underneath he quotes the last chord of the work, with "I am the Spirit that denies!")

The dedication on the title page reads:

"TO MY TWO FRIENDS (E DUOBUS UNUM) HUGH M'DIARMID and C.M. GRIEVE" and proceeds "LIKEWISE TO THE EVERLASTING GLORY OF THOSE FEW MEN BLESSED AND SANCTIFIED IN THE CURSES AND EXECRATIONS OF THOSE MANY WHOSE PRAISE IS ETERNAL DAMNATION.

J. Curwen & Sons of London published the score in 1931.

Performances 
There have to date been over 20 performances of the complete Opus clavicembalisticum: they are listed on the Sorabji Archive website. 

The first was by Sorabji himself on 1 December 1930, in Glasgow, under the auspices of "The Active Society for the Propagation of Contemporary Music".

Pars prima was performed by John Tobin on 10 March 1936; this performance is noted to have taken approximately twice as long as the score dictates. This performance, and its reception, may have led to Sorabji's "ban" on public performances of his works; he asserted that "no performance at all is vastly preferable to an obscene travesty". Sorabji maintained this veto until 1976.

The next public performance of Opus clavicembalisticum took place in 1982, at the hands of the Australian pianist Geoffrey Douglas Madge. A recording of the performance was released on a set of four LPs, which are now out of print. Madge performed it in public in its entirety on six occasions from 1982 to 2002, including once in 1983, at Mandel Hall in Chicago, a recording of which was released by BIS Records in 1999.

John Ogdon publicly performed the work in London twice, towards the end of his life, and produced a studio recording of the work. Jonathan Powell gave his first performance of the work in London in 2003 ; he has since played it in New York (2004), Helsinki and St. Petersburg (2005) and, in 2017, he embarked on a tour with it to include performances in Brighton, London, Oxford, Karlsruhe, Glasgow, Brno and elsewhere.

The only other verifiable and complete public performances of this work have been given by Daan Vandewalle in Brugge, Madrid and Berlin, although a number of pianists have performed excerpts, which are usually the first two movements. For example, Jean-Jaques Schmid performed part of the work at the Biennale Bern 03 and Alexander Amatosi performed the first movement at the University of Durham School of Music in 2001.

References

Sources

External links 
 
 Errata list
 The Sorabji Archive – information and list of performances

Compositions for solo piano
Compositions by Kaikhosru Shapurji Sorabji
1930 compositions